Nowsud (also Romanized as Nowsūd and Nawsūd) is a Kurdish city & capital of Nowsud District, Paveh County, Kermanshah Province, Iran.  At the 2006 census, its population was 1,562, in 438 families.

References

Populated places in Paveh County

Cities in Kermanshah Province
Kurdish settlements in Kermanshah Province